Nikolay Pushnitsky was a sailor from the Russia, who represented his native country at the 1912 Summer Olympics in Nynäshamn, Sweden. Pushnitsky took the bronze in the 10 Metre.

References

Sources
 
 

Russian male sailors (sport)
Sailors at the 1912 Summer Olympics – 10 Metre
Olympic sailors of Russia
Olympic bronze medalists for Russia
Olympic medalists in sailing
Medalists at the 1912 Summer Olympics